Azeyevo is the name of several rural localities in Russia.

Azeyevo, Ryazan Oblast, a selo in Azeyevsky Rural Okrug of Yermishinsky District in Ryazan Oblast
Azeyevo, Republic of Tatarstan, a selo in Novosheshminsky District of the Republic of Tatarstan